Blaesodactylus ambonihazo is a species of gecko endemic to Madagascar.

References

Blaesodactylus
Reptiles described in 2011